Barry Watling is a footballer who played as a goalkeeper in the Football League for Bristol City, Notts County, Hartlepool United, Chester City, Rotherham United and Sheffield Wednesday.

He also played for the North American Soccer League's (N.A.S.L.) Seattle Sounders during the 1974 and 1975 seasons, and was named as the First Team All Star Goalkeeper for the 1974 season. During the 1975 season he amassed a 2nd-best goals against average of 1.15 per game.

References

1946 births
Living people
Association football goalkeepers
People from Walthamstow
English footballers
Leyton Orient F.C. players
Bristol City F.C. players
Chelmsford City F.C. players
Notts County F.C. players
Hartlepool United F.C. players
Chester City F.C. players
Rotherham United F.C. players
Sheffield Wednesday F.C. players
English Football League players
English football managers
Maidstone United F.C. (1897) players
Maidstone United F.C. (1897) managers
North American Soccer League (1968–1984) players
Seattle Sounders (1974–1983) players
English expatriate sportspeople in the United States
Expatriate soccer players in the United States
English expatriate footballers